Wembley Central is an interchange station on the West Coast Main Line (WCML), London Overground and London Underground on the Watford DC line in Wembley, in north-west London, served by suburban services operated by London Underground and London Overground and regional services operated Southern services. It is on the east-west High Road. The station serves Wembley Stadium and the nearby Wembley Arena.

History
20 July 1837: London and Birmingham Railway line opened
1842: Station opened as "Sudbury"
1 May 1882: renamed "Sudbury & Wembley"
1 November 1910: renamed "Wembley for Sudbury", coincident with construction of the "LNWR New Line"
16 April 1917: Bakerloo line service commenced over New Line
1936 Street level building reconstructed with shopping arcade
1948 Further work in preparation for Olympic Games at Wembley Stadium
5 July 1948: renamed "Wembley Central"
1965 Station Square constructed on a  concrete raft over the station by Ravenseft Properties Limited (see also Stratford Centre), providing most of current layout
24 September 1982: Bakerloo line service withdrawn
4 June 1984: Bakerloo line service re-instated
November 2007: Station management transferred from Silverlink to London Underground
June 2008: 1936/1948 surface buildings in process of being demolished for redevelopment
February 2009: Southern services between Milton Keynes and East Croydon stop here (each hour Mon-Sat daytime).
December 2014: London Midland services between London Euston and Tring have been introduced (each hour Mon-Sat daytime).
 December 2022: London Northwestern Railway services between London Euston and Tring withdrawn

Accidents and incidents
On 13 October 1940, an express passenger train was derailed after it collided with a platform barrow obstructing the line. Several people were killed and many more were injured.
In 1984, a passenger train overran a signal and collided with a freight train, killing three people.

Services and operations
Services at Wembley Central are operated by London Underground on the Bakerloo line, London Overground and Southern. The off-peak service at the station in trains per hour is:

London Underground (Bakerloo Line)
 6 tph to Harrow & Wealdstone
 6 tph to Elephant & Castle

London Overground
 4 tph to 
 4 tph to 

Southern
 1 tph to 
 1 tph to 

Wembley Central has the appearance of an underground station due to the elevated position of the High Road (where the main entrance was until recently behind a 1940s shopping arcade) and the enclosed nature of the platforms below the raft upon which Station Square is built; it is actually generally at or above the local ground level, having been reconstructed by British Rail in its current form during the 1960s electrification of the West Coast Main Line. It is the first station out of Euston to have platforms on all three pairs of tracks and the combination of the confined space and through trains passing at speed on platforms 3-6 (the main line platforms) create a wind tunnel effect which can be dangerous for passengers.

As a result, the main line National Rail platforms (for Southern, London Northwestern Railway, and Wembley Stadium additional services) are locked out of use for most of the day and entrance is only allowed 5 minutes before the trains are due, the Southern services, which use platforms 5 and 6 (on the slow main line). Passengers alighting from these services must make their way to the end of the platform and staff will lead them out of the station. Gates into these platforms open 5 minutes before the train is expected to arrive.

The station was modernised in 2006 by Silverlink with additional safety features.

When a major event occurs at Wembley Stadium, all London Northwestern Railway services to and from Euston call here always stopping at platforms 5 and 6. Avanti West Coast services are formed of trains which are too long for the platforms and take longer to set down and pick up. As a result, these services will make additional stops at Watford Junction or Milton Keynes, for customers to change onto London Northwestern Railway or Southern services.

Fast London Northwestern Railway services using platforms 5 and 6 are usually longer than the platforms. So, when trains are formed of more than six coaches, customers wishing to board and alight the train must do so from the front four coaches only. British Transport Police officers maintain a high presence on match days, particularly at this station and on all train services.

Station works
The passenger footbridge at the London end of the station, completed in late 2006 by civil engineers C Spencer Ltd, carries extra foot traffic to and from the platforms during event days at the nearby Wembley Stadium; the everyday access is at the "country" end of the platforms. In practice, this means the bridge is usually locked and out of use, only being opened when the stadium itself is in use.

Other recent works include the resurfacing of platforms 1 and 2 complete with the installation of curved steel cladding panels also completed by contractor, C Spencer Ltd. The station's staff received refurbished messing facilities and new public toilets have also been installed.

In 2011–12, the station was made step-free, in preparation for the Olympics. A step-free route was provided between the station entrance and platforms 1 and 2 for the first time, with the installation of two new lifts and a stair lift. The toilets were refurbished to make them fully accessible. Two platforms were extended as well. This improvement scheme cost £2.5m.

Redevelopment

In June 2008, the London Borough of Brent (Local council) planned that the station was going to be demolished for redevelopment, as part of the Wembley Central Square plan, by St. Modwen construction company (although the plan also included new apartments, shops and open space surface).

Connections

London Buses routes 18, 79, 83, 92, 182, 204, 223, 297, 483 and H17 and night routes N18 and N83 serve the station.

References

External links 

Bakerloo line stations
Railway stations in the London Borough of Brent
DfT Category C2 stations
Tube stations in the London Borough of Brent
Former London and North Western Railway stations
Railway stations in Great Britain opened in 1842
Railway stations served by London Overground
Railway stations served by Govia Thameslink Railway
Stations on the West Coast Main Line
Wembley